MMT is a subproject of the Eclipse Modeling Project (EMP) for Model-to-Model Transformations. In April 2012, it was renamed from M2M to avoid confusion with the increasingly popular Machine-to-Machine usage.

Three components are available for model to model transformations: 
ATL (ATLAS Transformation Language) from INRIA
Operational QVT, originally from Borland
Declarative QVT, from Willink Transformations

The QVT components provide the Eclipse implementation of the OMG QVT standard (the Eclipse foundation is now a member of OMG as of January 2007).

External links
 MMT Project home page

Specification languages